Magnús Stefánsson (born 1 October 1960) is an Icelandic politician. He has been member of the Althing (Iceland's parliament) for the Progressive Party for the Western Iceland constituency (1995–99; 2001–03) and for the Northwest Iceland constituency since 2003. He has been vice-chairman of the Progressive Party parliamentary group since 2003, and was Minister of Social Affairs from 2006 to 2007.

References

1960 births
Living people
Magnus Stefansson
Magnus Stefansson
Magnus Stefansson